The B.C. Rich Warlock is a solid body electric guitar and bass guitar made by B.C. Rich. It features a distinct jagged shape and two humbucker pickups, and has been associated with the heavy metal scene.

History 
The Warlock was designed by company founder Bernardo Chavez Rico in 1969, stating: "This was the only guitar I ever designed at a drafting table, using straight-edges and French curves. It was lots of curves going into straight lines. At first I thought it was the ugliest guitar I'd ever designed." The design wasn't built until local guitarist Spencer Sercombe of Shark Island prompted Rico to do so, but once it was, it soon found favor in the emerging heavy metal scene. "The introduction of the Warlock in 1981 marked the beginning of B.C. Rich's rise to iconic status in heavy metal. [...] The confluence of B.C. Rich's far-out designs and the emerging hair metal culture of the late '70s and early '80s helped cement the brand's place in the market".

The guitar was constructed similarly to other B.C. Rich models such as the Seagull, Eagle, and Mockingbird, with neck-through construction, two DiMarzio humbucker pick-ups, and a Leo Quan Badass bridge. As the guitar was adopted by the heavy metal scene, later models featured Kahler and Floyd Rose vibratos and bolt-on necks.

Over the years since its introduction the Warlock has become a de facto image of a heavy metal guitar, so much so that in 2015 it was selected to represent Metal in the exhibition Medieval to Metal: The Art & Evolution of the Guitar at the Leigh Yawkey Woodson Art Museum.

Notable users

 Kerry King of Slayer
 Chris Poland of Megadeth
 Chris Kael of Five Finger Death Punch
 Blackie Lawless of W.A.S.P.
 Lita Ford
 Max Cavalera of Soulfly, formerly of Sepultura
 Mick Thomson of Slipknot
 Robb Flynn of Machine Head
 Phoebe Bridgers
 C.C. DeVille and Bobby Dall of Poison
 Paolo Gregoletto of Trivium (ex-Metal Militia)
 Paul Stanley of Kiss
 Mick Mars and Nikki Sixx of Mötley Crüe (Shout at the Devil-era)
 Craig Goldy of Dio and Giuffria
 ICS Vortex
 Shakey Graves
 Michael Stützer of Artillery
 Weird Paul Petroskey
 Tripp Eisen, formerly of Static-X, Dope and the Murderdolls
 Joey Jordison (when playing guitar for the Murderdolls)
 Jeordie White (when playing guitar for Marilyn Manson)
 The Seer of Magic Sword
 Terrance Hobbs of Suffocation

See also
 B.C. Rich Mockingbird

References

External links
 B.C. Rich Warlock product page at bcrich.com

B.C. Rich electric guitars